Otz Tollen (9 April 1882 – 19 July 1965) was a German actor and film director.

Born in Berlin, he made his film debut in the 1912 Joe May directed film In der Tiefe des Schachtes. His last film role was an appearance in the 1960 Nadja Tiller film The Ambassador.

Selected filmography

Actor
 According to Law (1919)
 Curfew (1925)
 The Great Opportunity (1925)
 Wrath of the Seas (1926)
 I Once Had a Comrade (1926)
 Hands Up, Eddy Polo (1928)
 Unternehmen Michael (1937)
 Gewitterflug zu Claudia (1937)
 Patriots (1937)
 Togger (1937)
 Signal in the Night (1937)
 Seven Slaps (1937)
 Eine Nacht im Mai (1938)
 Secret Code LB 17 (1938)
 The Governor (1939)
 Jud Süß (1940)
 Der große König (1942)
 The Little Residence (1942)
 The Crew of the Dora (1943)
 The Endless Road (1943)
 The Roedern Affair (1944)
 Kolberg (1945)
 The Court Concert (1948)
 Don't Ask My Heart (1952) 
 Winter in the Woods (1956)
 Stresemann (1957)
 The Ambassador (1960)

Screenwriter
 Prinz Louis Ferdinand (1927)

Director
 The Skull of Pharaoh's Daughter (1920)
 The Black Count (1920)

Bibliography
 Elley, Derek. The Epic Film: Myth and History. Routledge, 1984.

External links

1882 births
1965 deaths
German male film actors
German male silent film actors
Male actors from Berlin
Film directors from Berlin
20th-century German male actors